Indra Gunawan may refer to:
Indra Gunawan (footballer), Indonesian footballer
Indra Gunawan (swimmer), Indonesian swimmer
Indra Gunawan (badminton), Indonesian badminton player and coach